Blackthorn railway station was a railway station serving the village of Blackthorn, Oxfordshire, England. It was on what is now known as the Chiltern Main Line.

History

Blackthorn was one of six new stations that the Great Western Railway provided when it opened the high-speed Bicester cut-off line between Princes Risborough and Kings Sutton in 1910. The line became part of the Western Region of British Railways on nationalisation in 1948. British Railways closed Blackthorn station in 1953.

References

 
 

Disused railway stations in Oxfordshire
Former Great Western Railway stations
Railway stations in Great Britain opened in 1910
Railway stations in Great Britain closed in 1953